The Frankenstein Chronicles is a British television period crime drama series that first aired on ITV Encore on 11 November 2015, designed as a re-imagining of Mary Shelley's 1818 novel Frankenstein; or, The Modern Prometheus. Lead actor Sean Bean also acted as an associate producer on the first series. It follows Inspector John Marlott (Bean), a river police officer who uncovers a corpse made up of body parts from eight missing children and sets about to determine who is responsible.

The series co-stars Richie Campbell as Joseph Nightingale, Robbie Gee as Billy Oates, Tom Ward as Home Secretary Sir Robert Peel, Ed Stoppard as Lord Daniel Hervey, Vanessa Kirby as Lady Jemima (Lord Hervey's sister), and Anna Maxwell Martin as author Mary Shelley. Other historical characters portrayed include William Blake (first series), Ada Lovelace (second series) and Charles Dickens under his pseudonym of ‘Boz’. The first series consists of six episodes which opened to critical acclaim and drew an average 250,000 viewers per episode.

A&E subsequently acquired the series for broadcast in the United States, describing it as "thrilling and terrifying". On 20 June 2016, ITV announced that it had renewed it for a second six-part series, with production set for January 2017. Filming commenced in March 2017, with Laurence Fox and Maeve Dermody joining the cast. The writing team for the second series consisted of Michael Robert Johnson, Paul Tomalin, Noel Farragher, Colin Carberry, and Glenn Patterson, with all six episodes directed by Alex Gabassi. In December 2017, it was announced that Netflix had struck a deal to carry the programme in the United States and other territories but was removed in February 2022.

Cast 
 Sean Bean – Inspector John Marlott, a Thames River Police officer, who has early secondary stage syphilis.
 Tom Ward – Sir Robert Peel, the Home Secretary
 Richie Campbell – Joseph Nightingale, a Bow Street Runner
 Ed Stoppard – Lord Daniel Hervey, an impoverished nobleman and proprietor of a private charity hospital
 Vanessa Kirby – Lady Jemima Hervey, an impoverished noblewoman, sister to Lord Hervey
 Ryan Sampson – Boz, a journalist from The Morning Chronicle
 Robbie Gee – Billy Oates, a hardened street-smart criminal
 Anna Maxwell Martin – Mary Shelley, author of Frankenstein (series 1)
 Richard Clements - Percy Bysshe Shelley, poet and husband of Mary Shelley (series 1)
 Charlie Creed-Miles – Tom Pritty, a grave-robber working for the local surgeons (series 1)
 Eloise Smyth – Flora, a homeless child taken by Billy Oates to work as a prostitute (series 1)
 Samuel West – Sir William Chester, a renowned surgeon and pioneer of galvanism (series 1)
 Mark Bazeley – Garnet Chester, Sir William's cousin, also a surgeon (series 1)
 Elliot Cowan – Sir Bentley Warburton, Sir Robert Peel's political rival (series 1)
 Kate Dickie – Mrs. Bishop, the matron of a gang of murderers (series 1)
 Steven Berkoff – William Blake, author, artist and printmaker (series 1)
 Deirdre Mullins – Agnes Marlott, John Marlott's deceased wife (series 1)
 Laurence Fox – Frederick Dipple, a socialite with an interest in automata (series 2)
 Maeve Dermody – Esther Rose, a Jewish seamstress contracted by Mr. Dipple to provide clothing for his mechanical creations (series 2)
 Victoria Emslie – Automaton, one of Mr. Dipple's mechanical creations (series 2)
 Lily Lesser – Ada Byron, a brilliant female mathematician, assisting Mr. Dipple in creating his automata (series 2)
 Kerrie Hayes – Queenie Pickett, Dipple's housemaid and Nightingale's childhood friend (series 2)

Production 
The Frankenstein Chronicles was filmed in Northern Ireland in 2015.

Episodes

Series 1 (2015)

Series 2 (2017)

Reception 
On Rotten Tomatoes season 1 has an approval rating of 80% based on reviews from 10 critics.

Euan Ferguson at The Guardian concluded "It's genuinely rather good, and a beast of wholly different hide to Jekyll". Carl Wilson at The Globe and Mail wrote: "On balance, the season ended just as brilliantly grim as it started." Ben Travers at IndieWire said: "While it's unlikely to be remembered for as long as it took to make, Frankenstein certainly earned its shot at a long life on Netflix."

References

External links 
 
 

2015 British television series debuts
2017 British television series endings
2010s British drama television series
ITV television dramas
English-language television shows
Television shows set in London
Television shows set in Northern Ireland
British fantasy television series
Cultural depictions of Mary Shelley